Joel A. Miller is a British-American writer and filmmaker. He was the writer and director of the film The Still Life and wrote the autobiography Memoir of a Roadie.

Early life

Miller was born in Cambridge, England. His parents emigrated to Los Angeles when he was a child and he grew up in Southern California. He is the oldest of three children. When he was four years old, Miller's mother was stopped in a shopping mall by talent agent Dorothy Day Otis and he began working as a child actor and model.

In 1998 he graduated from the University of California, Santa Barbara with a degree in Art History.

Career

Film

Working as a teen in the art department Miller worked on films Things You Can Tell Just by Looking at Her, It's the Rage, Lucky 13, Durango Kids, and Second to Die.

In 2006 Warner Bros. released Miller's The Still Life.   Miller wrote, produced, and directed the film. The film screened throughout the country and won the bronze medal at the Park City Film Music Festival.

Music

In 1999, Miller worked at Brian Reeves recording studio the Jungle Room.  While there he worked for Poison, Billy Idol, and Dogstar.

In 2006, Warner Bros. released The Still Life Soundtrack.  Miller co-wrote most of the songs on the album including the song "God's Reasons", performed by Darius Rucker.  In 2006 Miller was a recipient of the ASCAP Plus award for the song "God's Reasons". In 2010 the song "Silent Light", co-written by Miller and performed by Dizzy Reed, appeared in the film Holyman Undercover.

In August 2020, he released his autobiography, Memoir of a Roadie, about working as a roadie for Stone Temple Pilots, Guns N' Roses, Poison, and The Cranberries. The book tells of his life touring with these bands and his further touring experiences with Black Sabbath, Ozzy Osbourne, Sharon Osbourne, Red Hot Chili Peppers, Foo Fighters, Oasis, Papa Roach, Disturbed, Godsmack, Warrant, Quiet Riot, NSYNC, Bush, No Doubt, Fishbone, Fuel, Korn, Metallica, Green Day, Kid Rock, Rage Against the Machine, Enuff Z'Nuff, The Turtles, Violent Femmes, Static-X, Third Eye Blind, Goo Goo Dolls, Slipknot, 3 Doors Down, and Veruca Salt.

Podcasting

Miller is the creator and host of Party Like a Rockstar Podcast.

Selected filmography

Books

Soundtracks

References

External links
 
 

English film directors
English screenwriters
English male screenwriters
English cinematographers
Living people
1977 births
People from Cambridge
British emigrants to the United States
University of California, Santa Barbara alumni
English novelists
English male novelists
American male non-fiction writers